Yevgeni Sergeyevich Ragulkin (born 25 November 1999) is a Russian football player.

Club career
He made his debut in the Russian Football National League for FC Tambov on 19 September 2018 in a game against FC Tom Tomsk.

References

External links
 Profile by Russian Football National League

1999 births
Living people
Russian footballers
Association football forwards
FC Tambov players
FC Tyumen players